Wang Hui-ling is a Taiwanese screenwriter. In 2001 she was nominated for Academy Award for Best Adapted Screenplay for the Crouching Tiger, Hidden Dragon. In 2014, she wrote the script for The Crossing directed by John Woo.

Early life and education 
Hui-Ling was born in Taipei, Taiwan. She graduated from Taipei College of Education.

Career 
Hui-Ling started her career with co-writing the script of Eat Drink Man Woman with director Ang Lee and James Schamus.

In 2007 she co-wrote the erotic thriller film Lust, Caution again with James Schamus and directed by Ang Lee.

In 2013 wrote the script for an epic The Crossing directed by John Woo that filmed in Beijing.

Filmography

Films 
 Eat Drink Man Woman (1994)
 Crouching Tiger, Hidden Dragon (2000)
 Fleeing by Night (2000)
 Tortilla Soup (2001) story
 Migratory Bird (2001)
 The Myth (2005)
 Lust, Caution (2007) also acted as Liao Tai Tai
 The Crossing (2014)
 The Crossing 2 (2015)
 Legend of the Demon Cat (2017)

 TV 
 April Rhapsody (2000)
 The Legend of Eileen Chang (2004)
 Thank You for Having Loved Me'' (2007)

References

External links 
 

Living people
Taiwanese screenwriters
Taiwanese film actresses
Taiwanese women writers
Actresses from Taipei
Year of birth missing (living people)
Hugo Award-winning writers